Exeter Township may refer to:
 Exeter Township, Clay County, Kansas
 Exeter Township, Monroe County, Michigan
 Exeter Township, Barry County, Missouri
 Exeter Township, Berks County, Pennsylvania
 Exeter Township, Luzerne County, Pennsylvania
 Exeter Township, Wyoming County, Pennsylvania

See also 
 Exeter-Fairmont Consolidated Township, Fillmore County, Nebraska

Township name disambiguation pages